International Theatre Festival DEMOLUDY is organized by Jaracza Theatre in Olsztyn, Poland. It offers space for multicultural dialog in East European countries.

The Festival presents contemporary drama written after 1989.

Artistic managers
Marcin Zawada (2009-)

Agnieszka Lubomira Piotrowska (2007-2008)

History

DEMOLUDY 2012
(Freedom Instead of Flowers)

17–20 October 2012

program:
 doc Theatre (Moscow), TWO IN YOUR HOME
 Katona Theatre (Budapest) THE FIRST LADIES (directed by Tamas Ascher)
 Teatr Act (Bucharest) GAMES IN THE YARD
 Lithuanian National Drama Theatre (Vilnius) CHAOS (directed by Yana Ross)
 Teatr Dramatyczny im. Jerzego Szaniawskiego w Wałbrzychu (Wałbrzych) ALEKSANDRA. RZECZ O PIŁSUDSKIM
 Teatr im Stefana Jaracza w Olsztynie (Olsztyn), KRÓLOWA CIAST/QUEEN OF COOKIES

DEMOLUDY 2011
(In A Distorted Mirror)

17–22 October 2011

program:
 Karbido (Wrocław, Poland) TABLE (STOLIK)
 Maladype Színház (Budapest, Hungary) EGG(S)HELL
 Katona József Színház (Budapest, Hungary) RATTLEDANDDISAPPEARED
 Divadlo Buchty A Loutky (Prague, Czech Republic) LYNCH
 Teatrul Mic (Bucharest Romania) SADO MASO BLUES BAR
 Teatrul Tineretului (Piatra Neamţ, Romania) HERR PAUL
 Teatr Ochoty (Warsaw) OLD HAG (STARUCHA)
 Teatr im. Stefana Jaracza w Olsztynie LOST CZECHOSLOVAKIA (ZAGINIONA CZECHOSŁOWACJA)

DEMOLUDY 2010
(Czech Republic and Slovakia)

5–9 October 2010
 Boca Loca Lab (Prague, Czech Republic) EUROPEANS
 Divadlo Na zábradlí (Prague, Czech Republic) MIRACLE IN THE BLACK HOUSE
 Slovenské komorné divadlo (Martin, Slovakia) AND WE WILL WHISPER
 Dejvické divadlo (Prague, Czech Republic) DANGEONS AND DRAGONS
 Bábkové divadlo na Rázcestí (Banska Bystrica, Slovakia) SARCOPHAGUSES AND CASH DISPENSERS
 Divadlo SkRAT (Bratislava, Slovakia)DEAD SOULS
 Teatr im. Stefana Jaracza (Olsztyn, Poland) LEMONIADOWY JOE

DEMOLUDY 2009
(Balkan countries)

14–19 September 2009
 Pozorište Atelje 212 (Belgrade, Serbia); ( "Odumiranje" and "Pomorandžina kora")
 Jugoslovensko dramsko pozorište (Belgrade, Serbia); ("Barbelo, o psima i deci" and "Huddersfield")
 Kamerni Teater 55 (Sarajevo, Bosnia); ("Žaba")
 Slovensko Mladinsko Gledališče (Ljubljana, Slovenia); ("Fragile!")
 KUFER (Zagreb, Croatia); ("O iskrenosti ili odgovornost kapitala")
 Teatr im. Jaracza (Olsztyn, Poland); ("Kobieta-bomba")

DEMOLUDY 2008
 Teatr im. Eugene`a Ionesco (Chişinău, Moldavia); ("Fuck you, Eu.ro.pa!")
 SounDrama Studio (Moskwa, Russia); ("Gogol. Wieczory")
 Teatr Open Circle (Wilno, Lithuania); ("Open Circle")
 Teatr Wolny (Minsk, Belarus); ("Strefa milczenia. Tryptyk")
 Teatr Dramatyczny im. Cypriana Kamila Norwida  (Jelenia Góra, Poland); ("Podróż poślubna")
 Teatr Współczesny im. Edmunda Wiercińskiego (Wrocław, Poland); ("Księga Rodzaju 2")
 Katarzyna Figura (Warszawa, Poland); ("Badania terenowe nad ukraińskim seksem")

External links
 DEMOLUDY Festival official page
 DEMOLUDY Festival on Myspace
 Jaracza Theatre Olsztyn page

Theatre festivals in Poland
Autumn events in Poland